Boronia laxa is a plant in the citrus family Rutaceae and is endemic to a small area in the Northern Territory, Australia. It is a low-lying, short-lived shrub with hairy branches, leaves and flower parts, simple leaves and white to mauve flowers with the sepals longer and wider than the petals.

Description
Its branches, leaves and some flower parts are covered with star-like hairs. The sepals and petals enlarge as the fruit develops. Flowering occurs mainly from January to June.

Taxonomy and naming
Boronia laxa was first formally described in 1997 by Marco F. Duretto who published the description in  Australian Systematic Botany. The specific epithet (laxa) is a Latin word meaning "loose", "slack" or "unstrung".

Distribution and habitat
Boronia laxa grows in sandstone heath and woodland on Mount Brockman in Kakadu National Park and on the nearby Arnhem Plateau.

References 

laxa
Flora of the Northern Territory
Plants described in 1997
Taxa named by Marco Duretto